Javier George (born 27 January 2001) is a Guyanese professional footballer who plays as a midfielder for League1 Ontario club Simcoe County Rovers and the Guyana national team.

Early life
Born in Guyana, George moved to Canada at the age of 6. At the age of 8, he started playing organized football with Toronto Skillz FC.

Club career
He made his debut for the Toronto Skillz FC first team in League1 Ontario on August 28, 2016 against the Woodbridge Strikers.

In 2017, he joined the Toronto FC Academy, playing for their youth teams, including three matches in League1 Ontario in 2018.

In 2019, he joined the French club Stade Beaucairois. He made his debut on March 8, 2020 against Toulouse Rodéo FC.

On October 7, 2021 Canadian Premier League club York United announced they had signed George to a contract through the end of the 2021 season. He made his debut for York on November 9 against Forge FC. In June 2022, he briefly rejoined York on a short-term contract as an emergency relief player during a York injury crisis.

In March 2023, he joined League1 Ontario side Simcoe County Rovers FC.

International career
He first represented the Guyana U20 team at the 2020 CONCACAF U-20 Championship qualifying tournament. After initially being denied entry into Nicaragua, the host country, after failing to satisfy the 10-day quarantine period for the Yellow Fever vaccine, he entered the country and made his debut in the team's third game against the US Virgin Islands U20 team.

He represented the Guyana national team in a 2–0 2022 FIFA World Cup qualification loss to Puerto Rico on 8 June 2021.

Career statistics

Club

References

External links

2001 births
Living people
Association football midfielders
People from New Amsterdam, Guyana
Guyanese footballers
Canadian soccer players
Guyanese emigrants to Canada
Guyanese expatriate footballers
Guyanese expatriates in France
Canadian expatriate soccer players
Canadian expatriate sportspeople in France
Expatriate footballers in France
Championnat National 3 players
League1 Ontario players
Canadian Premier League players
Toronto FC players
Toronto Skillz FC players
York United FC players
Guyana under-20 international footballers
Guyana international footballers
Simcoe County Rovers FC players